Calligaris is an Italian surname. Notable people with the surname include:

Chiara Calligaris (born 1971), Italian Olympic sailor
Mauro Calligaris (1952–2000), Italian Olympic swimmer
Novella Calligaris (born 1954), Italian Olympic swimmer, sister of Mauro
Romana Calligaris (1924–2002), Italian swimmer, mother of Mauro and Novella
Sergio Calligaris (born 1941), Argentine-born pianist, composer and piano teacher
Viola Calligaris (born 1996), Swiss footballer

Greek-language surnames